DIN 1530 is a standard by the German Institute for Standardization for ejector pins used in injection moulds. Ejector pins are used to eject plastic or alloyed products from the mould after solidification.

1530